Santa Catalina, officially the Municipality of Santa Catalina, is a 5th class municipality in the province of Ilocos Sur, Philippines. According to the 2020 census, it has a population of 14,493 people.

The feast of the town is celebrated every 25th day of November to celebrate the feast day of Saint Catherine of Alexandria (the town's patron saint).

History

Etymology
When the Augustinians were busy with the Christianization of the Ilocos Region, a group of missionaries sailed westward through the river known as "El Mestizo" to the place now called Santa Catalina. They were also looking for fresh water, since the area where he landed yielded only salty water.  When they finally found a fresh water spring up north, and were busy quenching their thirst, some of them saw an image of a beautiful lady near the place where he drank, which disappeared after a few minutes.  One of them recognized the image as that of Saint Catherine of Alexandria. The Augustinians returned to Villa Fernandina (Vigan) and reported this matter to their superiors.  This resulted in the construction of a church in the town with Saint Catherine of Alexandria as the patron saint.  It was also declared that Santa Catalina be the name of the town.

A replica of the cross once planted by Salcedo and his party—to signify that the Spanish has conquered the area—stands near the entrance to the municipality.

Geography

Barangays
Santa Catalina is politically subdivided into 9 barangays. These barangays are headed by elected officials: Barangay Captain, Barangay Council, whose members are called Barangay Councilors. All are elected every three years.
 Cabaroan
 Cabittaogan
 Cabuloan
 Pangada
 Paratong
 Poblacion
 Sinabaan
 Subec
 Tamorong

It has 3 sitios, namely:
 Calawaan in barangay Tamorong
 Mindanao, formerly Sabangan in barangay Paratong
 Punta in barangay Cabittaogan

Climate

Demographics

In the 2020 census, Santa Catalina had a population of 14,493.

Economy 

As of February 2006, Santa Catalina with a poverty incidence of 7.9 percent and Vigan City with a poverty incidence of 8.6 percent, are the top two municipalities/cities with lowest poverty incidences in Ilocos Sur, and for the entire northern Luzon. This is among the results of the Poverty Mapping Project implemented by the National Statistical Coordination Board (NSCB) with funding assistance from the World Bank ASEM Trust Fund in response to the increasing demand for local level poverty estimates.

Trade
The main source of income for the locals include farming, fishing and small-scale businesses. As with most Philippine towns, the phenomenon of migrant labor has also contributed much to the development of the town. It is evidenced by the numerous mansions and large houses that dot the area along with the vast expanse of active farms and fields. Santa Catalina is only four (4) kilometers away from Vigan City, which is the province's center of commerce and trade, and because of this; there are few establishments in the locality. Santa Catalina has yet to establish a Central Business District (CBD). Residents currently go to Vigan to sell their produce and at the same time buy their household needs and other goods and merchandise that will be retailed in the locality.

Light Industries
Santa Catalina also has manufacturing of concrete well rings-a material used as reservoir in the making of open-dug wells to irrigate farm lots. There are also service-oriented industries such as gravel and sand businesses that cater to the needs of the Housing Sector and the metal crafts that manufacture sidecars for motorized-tricycles. These industries do have limited employment. One pioneering industry in the locality is the manufacture of Cigars but this industry is already nearing its extinction because of lack of the raw materials (native tobacco) that were used in the manufacture. We do have also the Onion Dehydration Plant an industry that pulverized onion that was exported in different Asian countries. The reason why this dehydrating plant had closed was because of dollar fluctuations.

Government
Santa Catalina, belonging to the first congressional district of the province of Ilocos Sur, is governed by a mayor designated as its local chief executive and by a municipal council as its legislative body in accordance with the Local Government Code. The mayor, vice mayor, and the councilors are elected directly by the people through an election which is being held every three years.

Elected officials

Agriculture
A total of 696.5888 hectares or 74.581% of the total land area of Santa Catalina is utilized for crop production. Croplands are found in every barangay. The whole area of 696.588 hectares is planted with rice during rainy season. 30 hectares or 4.31 percent of the total agricultural land is planted with white corn while 20 hectares or 2.87 percent are planted with corn. Next to rice/corn season, farmers also plant vegetables with a total effective area of 1,150 hectares or 165.09 percent of the agricultural lands. Onions, cabbage, cauliflower, sweet pepper, eggplant, beans, tomato, sweet potato, yam beans, mongo and peanut are the vegetables that are planted. Because of the limited agricultural land in the municipality, inter cropping farming system are commonly practiced. As had been mentioned earlier that 696.588 hectares are planted with rice and corn while 1,150 hectares are planted with vegetable. This municipality has been known as the “VEGETABLE BOWL OF THE NORTH”. The total value of vegetable production alone is PhP 523.04 million that brings a lot of income to farmers.

Poultry, Livestock And Fisheries
The farmers in the locality do not produce livestock or poultry in commercial scale but mostly on the backyard level. Livestock such as cows and water buffalo were being raised to help farmers in their farm needs and serves as working animal. Likewise goats were raised but not in herds and these are for local and home consumption of the farmers. Likewise farmers do not raise poultry in commercial scale but they raised chickens in backyard scale. Most farmers raised fighting cocks which commands higher prices in the market. The total area for fishponds is 53.9021 hectares. These fishponds are almost located in every barangay but the biggest area is at barangay Cabittaogan. Fishponds are classified as a) brackish pond where milkfish are cultured, b) freshwater for the production of tilapia, c) fish cages, d) Municipal fishing grounds which were found within 15 kilometers from the shoreline of coastal barangay and e) communal fishing grounds found in Govantes River.

Education

It has 7 elementary schools, namely:
Santa Catalina Central
Bernardo P. Ragasa Elementary
Cabittaogan Elementary
Paratong Elementary
Pangada-Cabaroan Elementary
Calawaan Elementary
Cabuloan Elementary

It has two high schools, namely:
Cabittaogan High School and
Santa Catalina High School (formerly known as Benito Soliven Institute).

Sister cities
Makati, Philippines

References

External links
Community Website of Santa Catalina, Ilocos Sur
Philippine Standard Geographic Code
Philippine Census Information
Local Governance Performance Management System

Municipalities of Ilocos Sur